Sant Nenuram Ashram is an Ashram located in Islamkot city in the Tharparkar District in the Sindh province of Pakistan. It is one of the most revered temples of the Hindu community in Pakistan. It is 45 km away from the district capital Mithi. The ashram is spread over a 10-acre  land containing temples and resting places. 

The ashram was established by the Hindu saint Sant Nenuram. The Ashram provides food to hundreds of people every day irrespective of their religion and caste. The Sant Nenuram Mela- three day festival commemorating the death anniversary of Sant Nenuram is visited by a large number of Hindus and Muslims

About

The Sant Neenu Ram was born in 1898 in the Islamkot. He was very inspired by the teachings of  Hindu saint Poorun Bharti whose shrine is 7 km away from Islamkot. He spent years at that shrine and then came back to his Islamkot to spread the teachings of Pooran Bharti and built the ashram. He built a community kitchen in ashram to serve food for everyone irrespective of their caste and religion. To feed the visitors to the ashram, he  used to go from house to house to collect food. 
 Today many devotees coming to the ashram bring food items for preparing food. Devotees also bring food for animals and birds residing in the ashram.

Gallery

See also
Parbrahm Ashram
Ramapir Temple Tando Allahyar
Churrio Jabal Durga Mata Temple
Umarkot Shiv Mandir

References

Hindu temples in Pakistan
Hindu temples in Sindh
Tharparkar District
Ashrams